Ilhéu de Cima is a small island about 400 meters off the east coast of Porto Santo Island, Madeira, Portugal. The islet is 121 meters high, bare and nearly flat, with steep cliffs towards the sea. It is the easternmost point of the Madeira archipelago. It is part of the Network of Marine Protected Areas of Porto Santo (RAMPPS), which covers the six islets around Porto Santo and the marine areas surrounding them. There is a lighthouse on the northeastern part of the island. It is a 15 m high masonry tower, with focal height 124 m. It went into operation in 1901.

Nature

The island is home to several endemic species of land snails, including Lampadia webbiana, Amphorella cimensis, and Hystricella turricula, which only occurs on Ilhéu de Cima.

References

External links
Photo of Ilhéu de Cima 

Porto Santo Island